San Jacinto, officially the Municipality of San Jacinto, is a 3rd class municipality in the province of Pangasinan, Philippines. According to the 2020 census, it has a population of 44,351 people.

Etymology and history
Padre Herminigildo Milgar founded the town on August 17, 1598, which was named after Hyacinth of Poland, canonized on April 17, 1594, by Pope Clement VIII.

San Jacinto became a Municipality in 1601, one of the oldest towns in Pangasinan.

Geography

Barangays
San Jacinto is politically subdivided into 19 barangays. These barangays are headed by elected officials: Barangay Captain, Barangay Council, whose members are called Barangay Councilors. All are elected every three years.

Climate

Demographics

Religion

Parish Church of St. Hyacinth 

The 1590 Parish Church of St. Hyacinth (Vicariate of Santo Tomas de Aquino, San Jacinto, 2431 Pangasinan, 23,628 Catholics, Feast day, August 17, Parish Priests are Rev. Fr. Victor Embuido) is under the jurisdiction of the Roman Catholic Archdiocese of Lingayen-Dagupan, Roman Catholic Diocese of Urdaneta (Vicariate III: Queen of the Most Holy Rosary). Its Vicar Forane is Rev. Fr. Genaro A. Herramia.

Father Diego Aduarte accounts that the 1898 Pueblo of San Jacinto existed by virtue of  the Dominican capitular acts of 1604 statement that the Ilocanos settled at San Jacinto.

In 1699, it was granted a resident vicar but later annexed  to Manaoag or Mangaldan. As early as 1598, San Jacinto church existed, but in 1719 the 1653 new church was burned paving for the construction of a new one in 1731 whose façade and tower were destroyed by the 1848  and 1892 earthquakes.

Saint Hyacinth of Poland (Hyacinth), (b. ca. 1185 in Kamień Śląski (Ger. Groß Stein) near Opole (Ger. Oppeln), Upper Silesia – d. 15 August 1257) was a Doctor of Sacred Studies and a secular priest, he worked to reform women's monasteries in his native Poland.

Economy 

The main source of livelihood of the residents include agriculture, construction, poultry, dressing plant, cornhusk weaving, sand and  gravel crushing plant and bag-and basket-making. 4th District Rep. Gina de Venecia initiated the Bayong and Corn–Husk Development Project fashioning these waste products into luxurious bags & baskets, and moccasins.

From Manila, you can reach San Jacinto, Pangasinan in 2 hours and 36 minutes without traffic via North Luzon Expressway in the distance of 204 km.

San Jacinto corn husks bayongs under the Jaime Ongpin Foundation replaced plastic bags due to environmental concerns of San Jacinto Weavers Association led by its president, Sixto Aquino. The town Memorandum of Agreement (MOA) granted resident trainings on Basic Bayong Weaving; Dyeing Raw Materials, Skills Upgrading, and Intensive Product Design & Innovations.

In 2011, San Jacinto had dispersed Tilapia fingerlings.

Government
San Jacinto, belonging to the fourth congressional district of the province of Pangasinan, is governed by a mayor designated as its local chief executive and by a municipal council as its legislative body in accordance with the Local Government Code. The mayor, vice mayor, and the councilors are elected directly by the people through an election which is being held every three years.

The San Jacinto Town hall was constructed from 1959 to 1963. In 2012, it began its (unfinished) renovation.

The Chief Executive of San Jacinto is its Municipal Mayor, Roberto O. Vera with his Municipal Vice Mayor, Hilario de Guzman, jr., with 8 Sangguniang Bayan Councilors who hold offices at the Municipal Town Hall and Legislative Office/Session hall.

Elected officials

Education
San Jacinto National High School
Lobong National High School
San Jacinto Catholic School (private)

Gallery

References

External links

 San Jacinto Profile at PhilAtlas.com
  Municipal Profile at the National Competitiveness Council of the Philippines
 San Jacinto at the Pangasinan Government Website
 Local Governance Performance Management System
 [ Philippine Standard Geographic Code]
 Philippine Census Information

Municipalities of Pangasinan
1598 establishments in the Spanish Empire
Populated places established in 1598